Weiße Traun is a river of Bavaria, Germany. It is formed at the confluence of the Fischbach and the Seetraun south of Ruhpolding. At its confluence with the Rote Traun near Siegsdorf, the Traun is formed.

See also
List of rivers of Bavaria

References

Rivers of Bavaria
Rivers of Germany